Experience is a 1921 American silent morality drama film produced by Famous Players-Lasky and distributed by Paramount Pictures. The allegorical film was directed by George Fitzmaurice and starred Richard Barthelmess. It was based on George V. Hobart's successful 1914 Broadway play of the same name. It was the film debut of Lilyan Tashman.

Experience is presumed to be a lost film.

Plot
The plot of Experience was summarized in the August 1921 issue of Photoplay magazine.

Cast

Richard Barthelmess as Youth
Reginald Denny (unidentified role)
John Miltern as Experience
Marjorie Daw as Love
E. J. Ratcliffe as Ambition
Betty Carpenter as Hope
Kate Bruce as Mother
Lilyan Tashman as Pleasure
R. Senior as Opportunity
Joseph W. Smiley as Chance
Fred Hadley as Tout
Harry J. Lane as Despair
Helen Ray as Intoxication
Jed Prouty as Good Nature
Barney Furey as Poverty
Charles A. Stevenson as Wealth
Edna Wheaton as Beauty
Yvonne Routon as Fashion
Ned Hay as Sport
Sibyl Carmen as Excitement
Robert Schable as Conceit
Nita Naldi as Temptation
Frank Evans as Work
Frank McCormack as Delusion
Louis Wolheim as Crime
Agnes Marc as Habit
Mrs. Gallagher as Degradation
Florence Flinn as Frailty
Mac Barnes as Makeshift
Leslie King as Gloom
Leslie Banks (unidentified role)

Production
Some of the minor roles were filled through contests held in various cities, which gave advance publicity for the film. For example, Edna Wheaton was selected for the role of "Beauty" through a contest run by the New York Daily News.

See also
List of lost films
Everywoman (1919)

References

External links

Film still from Sayre Collection of the University of Washington

1921 films
American silent feature films
Films directed by George Fitzmaurice
Lost American films
American black-and-white films
Silent American drama films
1921 drama films
1921 lost films
Lost drama films
1920s American films
1920s English-language films